Elections in Indonesia have taken place since 1955 to elect a legislature. At a national level, Indonesian people did not elect a head of state – the president – until 2004. Since then, the president is elected for a five-year term, as are the 575-member People's Representative Council (Dewan Perwakilan Rakyat, DPR), the 136-seat Regional Representative Council (Dewan Perwakilan Daerah), in addition to provincial and municipal legislative councils.

Members of the People's Representative Council are elected by proportional representation from multi-candidate constituencies. Currently, there are 77 constituencies in Indonesia, and each returns 3-10 Members of Parliament based on population. Under Indonesia's multi-party system, no one party has yet been able to secure an outright majority in a democratic election; parties have needed to work together in coalition governments. Members of the Regional Representative Council are elected by single non-transferable vote. There, Indonesia's 34 provinces treated as constituencies and, regardless of the size and population, every province return four senators.

Starting from the 2015 unified local elections, Indonesia started to elect governors and mayors simultaneously on the same date.

The voting age in Indonesia is 17, but anyone who has an ID card (KTP) can vote since persons under 17 who are or were married can get a KTP. Elections are conducted by the General Elections Commission (KPU) and supervised by the General Election Supervisory Agency (Bawaslu); their activities were overseen by Elections Organizer Honorary Council (DKPP).

Electoral principles
Indonesian election conduct abides by six principles of direct, general, free, confidential, honest, and fair. Those principles are abbreviated and commonly propagated as "Luber-jurdil". The first four principles of "Luber" are adopted by the New Order regime from the 1971 election. After the 1998 reform and the following political liberalisation, two extra principles of "Jurdil" are adopted for the first time in the 1999 election.

Direct (langsung): Voters shall vote on their own without any intermediary.
General (umum): All Indonesians that already satisfy voters' criteria, shall be able to vote without any restriction.
Free (bebas): Voters shall be able to vote by their own conscience without any coercion to vote for a particular candidate.
Confidential (rahasia): Secret ballot are guaranteed, and voters' choice shall not be known to others but themselves.
Honest (jujur): Voters, candidates, and electoral institutions shall perform their duty in complete honesty.
Fair (adil): Voters and candidates shall receive equal treatment by the law, with no particular voters or candidates shall receive preferential or discriminatory treatment.

The voters vote on the election ballot by punching a hole using a provided nail. For legislative ballots, punching can be done in one of the party logo, ballot number, or candidates' name. For presidential, gubernatorial, mayoral, and regent elections, punching can be done in one of the candidates' photograph, ballot number, or name. Ticking method was previously used started in 2009 elections, but it was reverted in 2014 elections.

History
Elections were first promised for January 1946 by vice-president Hatta on 3 November 1945, a promise repeated later the same month by Prime Minister Sjahrir and senior minister Amir Sjarifuddin in response to criticism of the cabinet for being non-democratic. They were never held, partly because the Indonesian National Revolution was still ongoing and the Republic only controlled Java, Sumatra and a few other areas, and partly because the socialist government was extremely unpopular due to its policy of negotiating with the Dutch colonial power, and would be expected to do very badly in any election. However, there were regional elections in Bali, Solo and Kediri.

Early elections (1955)

Indonesia's first general election elected members of the DPR and the Constitutional Assembly of Indonesia (Konstituante). The election was organised by the government of Prime Minister Ali Sastroamidjojo. Sastroamidjojo himself declined to stand for election, and Burhanuddin Harahap became Prime Minister.

The election occurred in two stages:
The election of the members of the DPR, which took place on 29 September 1955. Twenty-nine political parties and individuals took part;
The election for the members of the Constitutional Assembly, which took place on 15 December 1955.

The five largest parties in the election were the National Party of Indonesia (PNI), Council of Indonesian Muslim Associations Party (Masyumi), Nahdlatul Ulama (NU), Communist Party of Indonesia (PKI), and Indonesian Islamic Union Party (PSII).

Elections under the New Order (1971–1997)
Most elections during the New Order were conducted by General Elections Institution (LPU), as of 1997 election, it was led by Minister of Home Affairs.

First election (1971)

The first election after the establishment of Suharto's New Order took place on 5 July 1971. Ten political parties participated.

The five largest political parties were a newly-participate "functional group" Golkar, Nahdlatul Ulama, Muslim Party of Indonesia (Parmusi), PNI and PSII.

Further elections (1977–1997)

Five further legislative elections were held under Suharto administration. In accordance with the legislation, these were contested by two parties: United Development Party (PPP) and Indonesian Democratic Party (PDI); as well as Golkar. All elections in this period were won by Golkar.

On every March after the legislative election, the MPR would hold General Sessions (Sidang Umum MPR) in which included the election of President and soon after, the Vice President; as mandated by the original constitution. On all occasions, Suharto was the only person ever stood as a presidential candidate, thus enabling him to be elected unanimously. On vice-presidential elections, all candidates endorsed by Golkar (and the military faction) went on to be elected unanimously.

To ensure that Golkar always won more than 60% of the popular vote, the New Order regime used a number of tactics. These included:

Reducing the number of opponents: In 1973, the existing political parties were forced to merge into either PPP or PDI. These were the only parties allowed to contest general elections.
Weakening the remaining opponents: The two political parties were forbidden to criticise government policy, and the government had to approve all slogans they used. Furthermore, they were not allowed to organise at the village level (where the majority of Indonesians live). To stop the rise of charismatic figures, their candidates had to be vetted by the government. When a potentially charismatic figure (in the form of founding president Sukarno's daughter Megawati Sukarnoputri) became a leader of the PDI, the government engineered a political convention in Medan in 1996 to remove her. Ironically, the ensuing disturbances at the PDI's Jakarta headquarters began a chain of events that indirectly led to the downfall of the New Order.
Coercion to vote Golkar: Civil servants were ordered to support Golkar, or face accusations of insubordination. Private sector workers were reminded of the need for "stability". Many people believed the vote was not secret, and the government did little to persuade them otherwise. Many voters were still at school, and they were warned by teachers of a link between their choice at the ballot box and exam success 
The vote-counting process: The Golkar votes were counted first, then those of the two other parties. In the 1997 election, by 9 p.m. on the day after voting, Golkar had already been awarded 94% of its eventual vote. By contrast, the PPP had been credited with less than 10% of its final tally.
Vote-rigging: Although the counting at the local ballot boxes was conducted in public, with the ballot papers held up and the scores marked on boards, it was at the later stages where irregularities were frequently reported.
Multiple voting: There was no effective way of determining who had already voted, allowing many to do so more than once

Election in the reform era (1999–present)
The 1999 election was the first election held after the collapse of the New Order. It was held on 7 June 1999 under the government of B.J. Habibie. Forty-eight political parties participated.

The six largest parties which passed the electoral threshold of 2% were the Indonesian Democratic Party-Struggle (PDI-P), the reformed Golkar Party, PPP, National Awakening Party (PKB), National Mandate Party (PAN), and Crescent Star Party (PBB).

Under the constitution, the new president was elected by members of the all-house MPR in a joint sitting. This meant that although PDI-P won the largest share of the popular vote, the new President was not its nominee, Megawati Sukarnoputri, but Abdurrahman Wahid of PKB. Megawati then became vice president.

During its 2002 annual session, the MPR added 14 amendments to the 1945 Constitution. Included in these amendments were measures to reorganise the Indonesian legislature. Beginning in 2004, the MPR would be composed of the existing DPR and a new Regional Representative Council (DPD). Because all the seats in the MPR would be directly elected, this called for the removal of the military from the legislature, whose 38 seats for the 1999–2004 period were all appointed. This change and an amendment for direct election of the President and Vice-President were significant steps for Indonesia on the road towards full democracy.

The 2004 legislative election was held on 5 April 2004. A total of 24 parties contested the election. Golkar Party won the largest share of the vote, at 21.6%, followed by PDI-P, PKB, PPP and newly formed Democratic Party. 17 parties won legislative seats.

In 2005, Indonesia also began holding direct elections for governors, mayors and regents. Prior to this, local executives had been elected by a vote of the local legislative body. The first region to do so was Kutai Kartanegara, which held a regency election on 1 June 2005.

2009 legislative and presidential elections

Legislative elections for the DPD and the DPR were held in Indonesia on 9 April 2009. The presidential election was held on 8 July, with President Susilo Bambang Yudhoyono winning enough of the vote to make the run-off election unnecessary.

2014 legislative and presidential elections

Legislative elections for the DPD and the DPR were held in Indonesia on 9 April 2014. The presidential election was held on 9 July 2014, with Joko Widodo, then the Governor of Jakarta winning the election against Prabowo Subianto, a former general in Indonesia.

2019 legislative and presidential elections

In 2019, for the first time, legislative and presidential elections were held on the same day. Joko Widodo, running with Ma’ruf Amin as his vice-presidential candidate, again defeated Prabowo Subianto, running with Sandiaga Uno, winning 55.4% of the vote. In the legislative vote, PDI-P came first, with 19.3% of the vote, followed by Prabowo's Gerindra Party with 12.6% .

Voter registration

Criticism
Vote buying is common in Indonesia. In Indonesian, vote-buying is often known as politik uang ('money politics'). According to a survey of 440 respondents by Institut Riset Indonesia in January–March 2020 in areas where local elections were to be held in 2020, 60% of respondents said that they would allow their vote to be bought. Reasons for accepting vote buying include considering it as a gift that can not be rejected (35–46%), compensation for not working on the election day (25–30%), and supporting daily needs (9–16%). One of the common tactics of vote-buying is the so-called serangan fajar ('dawn attack'), which involves the giving of money a day or two before the election day. The amount ranges from Rp30,000 to Rp50,000. According to Burhanuddin Muhtadi in his book Kuasa Uang; Politik Uang dalam Pemilu Pasca-Orde Baru (The Power of Money; Money Politics in the Post-New Order Elections), vote-buying in Indonesia is done by individual candidates instead of political parties because of intense intra-party competition. This situation forces candidates to rely on their own networks instead of on the party machine.

In 2020, simultaneous local elections across the country were held in a single day amid the COVID-19 pandemic which stirred some controversy among the Indonesian public.

See also

Politics of Indonesia
List of political parties in Indonesia
One-party state especially the term "de facto one-party state"

Notes

References

 

Cribb, Robert, 'Elections in Jakarta', Asian Survey 24 no. 6 (June 1984), pp. 655–664.

 

KPU (Komisi Pemilihan Umum), http://kpu.go.id/Sejarah/pemilu1977.shtml, accessed 30 June 2006
 
Loveard, Keith, (1999) Suharto: Indonesia's Last Sultan, Horizon Books, Singapore, 
TVRI (Televisi Republik Indonesia) (1997), Indonesian evening news broadcasts of 29–31 May, 1–5 June 1997.
Prokurat, Sergiusz (2014), Indonesian parliamentary and presidential elections in 2014. The electoral process and economic challenges (PDF), Józefów, "Socio-economic relations between Europe and Asia in the 21st century”, pp. 197–210, https://web.archive.org/web/20160922174143/http://www.proeconomics.pl/artykuly/indonesianelections.pdf, accessed 30 July 2016.

External links

Adam Carr's Election Archive
Radio France Internationale in English explainer on 2009 elections plus reports of 1999 elections